Tetreuaresta is a genus of tephritid  or fruit flies in the family Tephritidae.

Species
Tetreuaresta audax (Giglio-Tos, 1893)
Tetreuaresta bartica Bates, 1933
Tetreuaresta copiosa Hering, 1942
Tetreuaresta deleta Hering, 1942
Tetreuaresta ellipa (Hendel, 1914)
Tetreuaresta guttata (Macquart, 1846)
Tetreuaresta heringi Norrbom, 1999
Tetreuaresta lata Hering, 1942
Tetreuaresta latipennis (Townsend, 1893)
Tetreuaresta myrtis (Hendel, 1914)
Tetreuaresta obscuriventris (Loew, 1873)
Tetreuaresta phthonera (Hendel, 1914)
Tetreuaresta plaumanni Hering, 1953
Tetreuaresta punctipennata Hering, 1942
Tetreuaresta rufula (Wulp, 1900)
Tetreuaresta spectabilis (Loew, 1873)
Tetreuaresta timida (Loew, 1862)

References

Tephritinae
Tephritidae genera
Diptera of South America
Diptera of North America